Lectionary 284, designated by siglum ℓ 284 (in the Gregory-Aland numbering) is a Greek manuscript of the New Testament, on parchment. Palaeographically it has been assigned to the 10th century.
Scrivener labelled it as 163e.

Only one leaf of the manuscript has survived.

Description 

The codex contains parts of the two lessons with the text of the Matthew (26:17-20) and Gospel of John (13:3-12) (Evangelistarium).

The text is written in Greek uncial letters, on 1 parchment leaf, in two columns per page, 21 lines per page.

History 

Scrivener and Gregory dated the manuscript to the 10th century. It is presently assigned by the INTF to the 10th century.

The manuscript was added to the list of New Testament manuscripts by Scrivener (number 163e) and Gregory (number 284e). Gregory saw the manuscript in 1886.

The manuscript is not cited in the critical editions of the Greek New Testament (UBS3).

Currently the codex is housed at the Biblioteca Ambrosiana (Q. 79 sup., fol. 1) in Milan.

See also 

 List of New Testament lectionaries
 Biblical manuscript
 Textual criticism
 Lectionary 285

Notes and references

Bibliography 

 

Greek New Testament lectionaries
10th-century biblical manuscripts
Manuscripts of the Ambrosiana collections